Pasuruan–Probolinggo Toll Road or Paspro Toll Road is a toll road in East Java, Indonesia. This  highway connects Pasuruan with Probolinggo. The toll road is operational since the end of 2018.

Sections
The Paspro toll road project consists of three sections,
Section I:  from Grati, Pasuruan Regency to Tongas, Probolinggo Regency. 
Section II:  between Tongas and Western Probolinggo city. 

Exits

See also
Trans-Java Toll Road

References

Toll roads in Indonesia
Toll roads in Java
Transport in East Java